Abdus Sattar (1 March 1906 – 5 October 1985) was a Bangladeshi statesman. A leader of the Bangladesh Nationalist Party (BNP), he served as the President of Bangladesh from 1981 to 1982, and earlier as the Vice President of Bangladesh. A jurist by profession, Sattar held numerous constitutional and political offices in British India, East Pakistan and Bangladesh. He was a cabinet minister, supreme court judge, and chief election commissioner.

Sattar was one of the few executive presidents in the country's history. Beset by health problems and old age, his short lived presidency was marked by growing political turmoil and interference from the military. Sattar was overthrown in the 1982 Bangladesh coup d'état.

Early life and career
Sattar was born in 1906 in Birbhum in the then Bengal Presidency, British India. He obtained his LLB and Master of Law from the University of Calcutta and joined the Calcutta High Court Bar in 1931 as a junior in the Chambers of A.K. Fazlul Huq. He specialised in Municipal Law. He became a protege of A. K. Fazlul Huq, the first Prime Minister of Bengal. He served in various municipal bodies in Calcutta as an activist for the Krishak Praja Party. In 1950, following the Partition of British India, Sattar moved to Dacca in the Dominion of Pakistan. He joined the Dhaka High Court Bar. He was elected to the Constituent Assembly of Pakistan in 1955. He served as the Home Minister of Pakistan and Education Minister of Pakistan in the cabinet of Prime Minister Ibrahim Ismail Chundrigar in 1957. He was appointed as a Justice in the Dhaka High Court, which he served between 1957 and 1968. He also presided over cases in the Supreme Court of Pakistan.

In 1969, Sattar was appointed as the Chief Election Commissioner of Pakistan. He organised the first general election of Pakistan in 1970, in which the Awami League gained a historic parliamentary majority to form government. The League was denied the handover of power by the then military junta led by General Yahya Khan. As the Bangladesh Liberation War erupted with a genocide against Bengali civilians, Sattar was stranded in Islamabad, West Pakistan, removed from official positions and interned by the Pakistani government. In 1973, Sattar returned to independent Bangladesh as part of the repatriation of stranded Bengali officials. He enjoyed rising prominence in Dhaka, but lived a quiet life with his wife and had no children.

Sattar served as chairman of the board of Directors in the Bangladesh Life Insurance Corporation (1973–1974), Chairman of the Journalist Wage Board (1974–1975) and Chairman of the Bangladesh Institute of Law and International Affairs. In 1975, he was appointed as an adviser to President Justice Abu Sadat Mohammad Sayem and vested in charge of the Ministry of Law and Parliamentary Affairs. In 1977, the new president and Chief Martial Law Administrator, Lt General Ziaur Rahman, appointed Sattar as Vice President of Bangladesh. With the reinstatement of multiparty politics, Sattar joined the newly formed Bangladesh Nationalist Party (BNP) in 1978. Speaking of Ziaur, Sattar said "He was like my son. I loved him too much. I loved him because he was trying to build this small country in a better way."

Presidency

When Ziaur was assassinated in May 1981, a frail Vice-President Sattar was in hospital and automatically became the acting president of Bangladesh. Speaking to foreign reporters in Bangabhaban on 4 June, he announced that elections within 180 days of the death of the former president were on schedule as per the constitution, to "foil any conspiracy to disturb the democratic process in the country." A state of emergency was imposed. The election date of 21 September was pushed back to 15 November, as opposition parties demanded more time to campaign. Violence occurred when 12 army officers were executed after being convicted of complicity in Ziaur's killing.

As the nominee of BNP, Sattar won the presidential election in 1981, beating with a big margin his principal challenger Kamal Hossain from the Bangladesh Awami League. Hossain and other opposition groups alleged the polls were rigged. The emergency was lifted after the election. Sattar appointed a 42-member Council of Ministers. He let Ziaur's controversial prime minister Shah Azizur Rahman continue in the top job. Sattar personally held the Defence and Planning portfolios. He appointed economist Mirza Nurul Huda as the vice president. Violence against Bengali Muslims in Assam in neighbouring India flared during Sattar's presidency.

Sattar formed a National Security Council to explore how the Bangladesh Armed Forces could contribute to the nation's development. He was elected unopposed as President of the Bangladesh Nationalist Party in January 1982. Sattar then formed a new cabinet. Vice-President Huda resigned on 21 March 1982, claiming that he was the victim of a conspiracy within the BNP. Sattar appointed Mohammad Mohammadullah as Huda's replacement.

1982 military coup
A bloodless coup-d'etat led by the Bangladesh Army chief Hussain Muhammad Ershad toppled Sattar's government in 1982. On the morning of 24 March, the heads of the Bangladesh Navy, the Bangladesh Air Force, the Bangladesh Rifles and the military secretary to the president entered Bangabhaban and forced Sattar to sign a statement relinquishing power. Martial law was declared. Sattar was replaced by the retired justice A. F. M. Ahsanuddin Chowdhury.

Death
Sattar died at the Suhrawardy Hospital in Dhaka on 5 October 1985, at the age of 79.

References

1906 births
1985 deaths
Bengali politicians
Bengali Muslims
People from Birbhum district
University of Calcutta alumni
Krishak Sramik Party politicians
Chief Election Commissioners of Pakistan
Justices of the Supreme Court of Pakistan
Bangladesh Nationalist Party politicians
Chairpersons of the Bangladesh Nationalist Party
Vice presidents of Bangladesh
Presidents of Bangladesh
Interior ministers of Pakistan
Education Ministers of Pakistan
Pakistani MNAs 1955–1958
Bangladeshi people of Indian descent
20th-century Bengalis